Espas (also Romanized as Espās; also known as Īsbāz and Ispas) is a village in Abharrud Rural District, in the Central District of Abhar County, Zanjan Province, Iran. At the 2006 census, its population was 383, in 102 families.

References 

Populated places in Abhar County